Applause Inc. was a company that produced stuffed toys and collectible figurines. The company produced licensed toys from Warner Bros., Disney, and Jim Henson's Muppets. Its principal subsidiaries included Dakin Inc. and International Tropic-Cal Inc. The Applause brand survives as part of Kid Brands.

History
The company was founded as The Wallace Berrie Company in 1966 by Wallace Berrie. In 1979 the company obtained worldwide rights to The Smurfs and released figurines in 1979 at $1.50 each. The figurines became one of the best-selling toys of 1982. That year, the company acquired the Applause division from Knickerbocker Toys, which came with the licenses to Disney, Sesame Street, and Raggedy Ann and Andy. In 1986, the company changed its name to Applause Inc. and released California Raisins merchandise. It would also produce various Batman merchandise, focusing largely on small figures and dolls, from the late 1980s into the early 1990s. In 1992, Applause released the Magic Trolls Babies toy line.

Dakin merger
From 1991 to 1995, the company built a strong retail business by focusing on its classic entertainment licensed brands with in-store merchandising displays as a platform for entertainment event properties, e.g. The Lion King, The Flintstones, Pocahontas, The Little Mermaid, Star Trek, and Star Wars. Also during this period, one of the most significant events was the company's acquisition of the licensed rights to the very popular Looney Tunes characters.

In late 1995 the company acquired Woodland Hills, California company, Dakin Inc., the most widely recognized brand name in stuffed animals. Dakin was founded in 1955 by Richard Dakin as an import business. This acquisition strengthened Applause's generic stuffed animal business to balance out its already strong entertainment license portfolio.

Applause created a Strategic Alliances Group to oversee products for food-related and premium-based programs such as from Taco Bell, KFC, Kellogg's, General Mills, and Pillsbury. In 1998 the company produced fast food toys for A Bug's Life, Mulan, Pokémon (KFC) and Godzilla.

Bankruptcy and acquisition
In 2004 CEO Bob Solomon killed himself once it became apparent the company was not going to survive. The company filed for bankruptcy shortly after his death. The Applause name was acquired by Russ Berrie in a bankruptcy auction.

References

 "Applause, a Novelty Maker, Sold to Management Group," The New York Times, September 26, 1997, p. C4(N)/D4(L).
 Bozman, Jean S., "New, Tougher Garfield Emerges," Computerworld, February 17, 1992, p. 53.
 Cuneo, Alice Z., "Hot Raisins; It's Licensed Products That Bring Big Bucks," Advertising Age, May 16, 1988, p. 30.
 "Custom Warehousing, Distributor Services Pay; Dakin, Stafford Make a Winning Combination," Playthings, May 31, 1989, p. 10.
 "Applause to Sell Name; Bankrupt Toy Company's Label to be Shed for $4 Million," Los Angeles Daily News, September 30, 2004.

External links
 Fundinguniverse.com

Toy brands
Toy companies established in 1966
Defunct manufacturing companies based in Greater Los Angeles
Toy companies of the United States
1966 establishments in California
American companies established in 1966
Manufacturing companies established in 1966